Logan, Illinois may refer to:
An alternate name for the village of Hanaford, Illinois
Logan, Edgar County, Illinois, an unincorporated community in Edgar County